British Sindhis are British citizens or residents who are of Sindhi origin. They comprise a sizable segment of the British Pakistani and British Indian communities.

History

The Sindhis originate from the Sindh region of southern Pakistan. Most Pakistani Sindhi immigrants are Muslims, with a minority of Hindus. Indian Sindhis, on the other hand, are mostly Hindus. They are secondary migrants, moving from Sindh to India following the 1947 partition of India and later settling in the UK. There are also a smaller number of Christians.

Demographics
Estimates of the total Sindhi population in the UK range from 15,000 to 30,000. According to Ethnologue, there are over 25,000 Sindhi-speakers in the country. Some Sindhis are notable businesspeople, such as Sonu Shivdasani and the Hinduja family. There is a small Sindhi community in Gibraltar, a British Overseas Territory. The community dates back to 1860 and the majority 

possesses British citizenship.

See also

 British Pakistanis
 British Indians
 British Asians
 Sindhi diaspora

Notes

References

 
Indian diaspora in the United Kingdom
Pakistani diaspora in the United Kingdom
Sindhi diaspora